Belleview can refer to:

 Belleview (Middletown, Delaware), listed on the National Register of Historic Places listings in southern New Castle County, Delaware
 Belleview (Harrods Creek, Kentucky), listed on the National Register of Historic Places listings in Jefferson County, Kentucky
 Belleview (Ridgeway, Virginia), listed on the National Register of Historic Places listings in Henry County, Virginia
 Belleview, California (disambiguation)
Belleview, Humboldt County, California, unincorporated community
Belleview, Tuolumne County, California, unincorporated community
 Belleview, Florida, city
 Belleview, Indiana, unincorporated community
 Belleview, Missouri, unincorporated community
 Belleview-Biltmore Hotel, Belleair, Florida
 Belleview station, a light rail station in Denver, Colorado

See also
Bellevue (disambiguation)
Belle Vue (disambiguation)
Belle vie (disambiguation)

ru:Бельвю